Elbert Parr Tuttle (July 17, 1897 – June 23, 1996) was the Chief United States circuit judge of the United States Court of Appeals for the Fifth Circuit from 1960 to 1967, when that court became known for a series of decisions crucial in advancing the civil rights of African Americans during the civil rights movement. A Republican from Georgia, he was among the judges that became known as the "Fifth Circuit Four". At that time, the Fifth Circuit included not only Louisiana, Mississippi, and Texas (its jurisdiction ), but also Alabama, Georgia, Florida, and the Panama Canal Zone.

Education and early career

Tuttle was born in Pasadena, California. In 1906, his family moved to Hawaii where he attended Punahou School. In October 1910, he and his brother Malcolm built and flew the first glider in Hawaii.

Tuttle graduated from Cornell University in Ithaca, New York in 1918 with a Bachelor of Arts degree.  Tuttle was the editor in chief of The Cornell Daily Sun. He was also the founder of the Beta Theta chapter of Pi Kappa Alpha Fraternity at Cornell and was a member of the Sphinx Head Society. He then fought in World War I in the United States Army Air Service from 1918 to 1919.

Tuttle received a Bachelor of Laws from Cornell Law School, where he served as editor-in-chief of the Cornell Law Quarterly, in 1923. He was a reporter for the New York Evening World for several years while attending law school.

Later career

After graduating from law school, he moved to Atlanta, Georgia, to practice law with the law firm of Sutherland, Tuttle & Brennan from 1923 to 1953 (the firm is now Eversheds Sutherland). Tuttle worked on tax litigation and also did pro bono work, including with the American Civil Liberties Union, and took on numerous civil rights cases.

Tuttle served as a colonel in the United States Army from 1941 to 1946, in World War II, declining a desk job. He was severely injured after engaging in hand-to-hand combat in Okinawa on the island of Ie Shima. He was awarded numerous medals for his service including the Purple Heart with Oak Leaf Cluster, the Legion of Merit, the Bronze Star, and the Bronze Service Arrowhead. Tuttle retired as a brigadier general and was often called "The General" by those who worked closely with him. After the War, Tuttle became more involved in politics, working with the Republican Party because of his opposition to segregation, which he associated mostly with southern Democrats. He was a general counsel for the United States Department of the Treasury from 1953 to 1954.

Federal judicial service

Tuttle was nominated by President Dwight D. Eisenhower on July 7, 1954, to the United States Court of Appeals for the Fifth Circuit, to a new seat authorized by 68 Stat. 8. He was confirmed by the United States Senate on August 3, 1954, and received his commission the next day. He served as Chief Judge from 1960 to 1967 and was a member of the Judicial Conference of the United States from 1961 to 1967. He assumed senior status on June 1, 1968. He was reassigned by operation of law to the United States Court of Appeals for the Eleventh Circuit on October 1, 1981, pursuant to 94 Stat. 1994. His service terminated on June 23, 1996, due to his death in Atlanta.

Georgia gubernatorial election dispute

In the aftermath of the disputed 1966 Georgia gubernatorial election between Democrat Lester Maddox and Republican Bo Callaway, Tuttle joined Judge Griffin Bell, later the United States Attorney General, in striking down the Georgia constitutional provision requiring that the legislature chose the governor if no general election candidate receives a majority of the vote. The judges concluded that a malapportioned legislature might "dilute" the votes of the candidate with a plurality, in this case Callaway. Bell compared legislative selection to the former County Unit System, a kind of electoral college formerly used in Georgia to select the governor but invalidated by the U.S. Supreme Court. Bell and Tuttle granted a temporary suspension of their ruling to permit appeal to the U.S. Supreme Court and stipulated that the state could resolve the deadlock so long as the legislature not make the selection. In a five-to-four decision known as Fortson v. Morris, the high court struck down the Bell-Tuttle legal reasoning and directed the legislature to choose between Maddox and Callaway. Two liberal justices, William O. Douglas and Abe Fortas, had argued against legislative selection of the governor, but the court majority, led this time by Hugo Black took the strict constructionist line and cleared the path for Maddox's ultimate election.

Honors

The Elbert P. Tuttle U.S. Court of Appeals Building was named in his honor in 1989. For his work in civil rights cases in the South, Tuttle received the Presidential Medal of Freedom in 1981. He has a star on Atlanta's International Civil Rights Walk of Fame.

References

Bibliography
Jack Bass, "The 'Fifth Circuit Four'", The Nation, May 3, 2004, p. 30-32.
 Anne Emanuel, Elbert Parr Tuttle: Chief Jurist of the Civil Rights Revolution, University of Georgia Press, Fall 2011.
 Nina Totenberg, Elbert Parr Tuttle, Quiet Civil Rights 'Revolutionary', NPR, October 5, 2011.
New Georgia Encyclopedia: Elbert Parr Tuttle
Eleventh Circuit profile
Story about the first glider flight in Hawaii
Stuart A. Rose Manuscript, Archives, and Rare Book Library, Emory University: Elbert P. Tuttle papers, 1917-1995

1897 births
1996 deaths
Wikipedia articles incorporating text from the Biographical Directory of Federal Judges
Judges of the United States Court of Appeals for the Fifth Circuit
Judges of the United States Court of Appeals for the Eleventh Circuit
United States court of appeals judges appointed by Dwight D. Eisenhower
20th-century American judges
Presidential Medal of Freedom recipients
United States Army Air Service pilots of World War I
United States Army personnel of World War II
Recipients of the Legion of Merit
Punahou School alumni
Cornell Law School alumni
Cornell University alumni
Georgia (U.S. state) Republicans
United States Army colonels